Artimet (until recently, Atarbekyan and Atarbekian; originally, Ali-Begli and Alibeklu) is a village in the Armavir Province of Armenia. The church of the village named after Saint Gregory the Illuminator, dates back to 1876.

Artimet has a population of 1,704 at the 2011 census, up from 1,630 at the 2001 census.

See also 
Armavir Province

References 

Populated places in Armavir Province